Rochedale Rovers are a semi-professional football club which plays at Underwood Park in Priestdale, Queensland, Australia and competes in the Football Queensland Premier League with junior teams competing in both Football Queensland and Football Brisbane competitions.

History
In November 1972, local resident Tommy Vance placed an advertisement in the local paper looking for people interested in forming a soccer club on a small field behind the historic Glen Hotel at Eight Mile Plains. 

In 1973, Rovers started their first ever game with a dominant 4-0 victory over Redlands United, all four goals coming from the boot of Darren Byrne.

From the start, local business identities came forward to help, including the late Graham Hogg of Graham Hogg Real Estate, Brian Fitzgibbon of the Glen Hotel and John Beerling from Galeprufe Garages. 

Within a few years the club had leased land at Underwood Park and with the help of a small army of volunteers had developed three fields (fenced and floodlit), a canteen, office and showers.

In the late 1970s a brick clubhouse was built with grandstands, full playing amenities, canteen and sports bar, at the time being one of the best facilities in Queensland.

In 2019, the original clubhouse was demolished to make way for a start of the art clubhouse based around the design of the original featuring the new Tom Vance and Keiran Cooper Grandstands and a full length verandah (extending the seating capacity to 500+) as well as a spectacular entrance way, top floor canteen and bar facilities.

Beneath the grandstand, which overlooks the main field, are modern changing rooms and storage facilities. 

To date, Rochedale have collected six Premierships (1986, 1999, 2007, 2008, 2010, 2017), six Championships (1985, 1986, 1993, 1995, 2011, 2019) and have produced three internationals in Jon McKain (Socceroos), Chris O'Connor (Olyroos), and Luke Brattan (Under20s).   

Former players turned professional include Shane Huke, Tim Smits, Matt Mundy, James Donachie and Steve Fitzsimmons. 

Of teams still active, only Lions, Bardon Latrobe and Brisbane City have won more Premierships.

Silverware
Premierships: 1986, 1999, 2007, 2008, 2010, 2017

Runners-up: 2011, 2009, 2006, 2005, 1998, 1996, 1995, 1993, 1992, 1991

Championships: 1984, 1985, 1993, 1995, 2011, 2019

Runners-up: 2012, 2010, 2006, 1998, 1992, 1991

Historical Finishing Positions 
Key: Year/League/Premiership/Post-season  *denotes equivalent of second tier

2020 *FQPL 5th/DNQ 

2019 *FQPL 4th/WON 

2018 *FQPL 6th/DNQ 

2017 BPL 1st/SEMI

2016 BPL 5th/DNQ 

2015 BPL 6th/DNQ 

2014 BPL 9th/DNQ 

2013 BPL 4th/SEMI 

2012 BPL 4th/GF 

2011 BPL 2nd/WON 

2010 BPL 1st/GF 

2009 BPL 2nd/SEMI 

2008 BPL 1st/SEMI 

2007 BPL 1st/WON 

2006 BPL 2nd/GF 

2005 BPL 2nd/SEMI 

2004 BPL 3rd/SEMI 

2003 BPL 6th/DNQ 

2002 BPL 10th/DNQ 

2001 BPL 4th/SEMI 

2000 BPL 3rd/NONE 

1999 BPL 1st/SEMI 

1998 BPL 2nd/GF 

1997 BPL 5th/DNQ 

1996 BPL 2nd/SEMI 

1995 BPL 2nd/WON 

1994 BPL 4th/SEMI 

1993 BPL 2nd/WON 

1992 BPL 2nd/GF 

1991 BPL 2nd/GF 

1990 BPL 9th/DNQ 

1989 BPL 6th/DNQ 

1988 BPL 8th/DNQ 

1987 BPL 9th/DNQ 

1986 Inter* 1st/WON 

1985 Inter* 4th/WON 

1984 Inter* 5th/NONE 

1983 Div1* 10th/DNQ 

1982 Div3 12th/NONE

1973-1981 tbc

References

External links
Official Website

Association football clubs established in 1972
Soccer clubs in Brisbane
Brisbane Premier League teams
1972 establishments in Australia
Logan City